Ephyra was a town of the Agraei in ancient Aetolia. Its site is unlocated.

References

Populated places in ancient Aetolia
Former populated places in Greece
Lost ancient cities and towns